Ek Main Aur Ek Tu is a 1986 Bollywood film directed by Ravi Tandon. It stars Shashi Kapoor, Tanuja with Raj Tandon, Rubina Khan in lead roles.

Cast
Shashi Kapoor
Tanuja
Raj Tandon
Rubina Khan
Shreeram Lagoo
Ranjeet

Soundtrack
All songs were composed by R. D. Burman.

References

External links
 

1980s Hindi-language films
1986 films
Films directed by Ravi Tandon
Films scored by R. D. Burman